Gradaterebra sorrentensis is a species of sea snail, a marine gastropod mollusk in the family Terebridae, the auger snails.

Description
The size of an adult shell varies between 6 mm and 8 mm.

Distribution
This marine species can be found off Western Australia.

References

 Terryn Y. (2007). Terebridae: A Collector's Guide. Conchbooks & NaturalArt. 59pp + plates

External links
 
 Fedosov, A. E.; Malcolm, G.; Terryn, Y.; Gorson, J.; Modica, M. V.; Holford, M.; Puillandre, N. (2020). Phylogenetic classification of the family Terebridae (Neogastropoda: Conoidea). Journal of Molluscan Studies

Terebridae
Gastropods described in 1999